Mathspace is an online mathematics program designed for students in primary/elementary, secondary, and higher education. It is designed for students aged between 7 and 18, and is used by schools in Australia, New Zealand, the United States, Canada, the United Kingdom, Hong Kong and India.

Mathspace uses an adaptive learning model to personalize the software experience for each student. The questions presented to a user are chosen by an algorithm that responds to past performance, and student input is evaluated to provide feedback on their progress within each problem. Additional support is offered in the form of hints and video tutorials to guide them to the solution. The software assesses each student's performance and generates accompanying report statistics.

Partnerships
Mathspace partnered with Eddie Woo in 2017. Together they created a video hub to categorize Woo's education videos in the various state curricula across Australia.

Awards

External links

References

Educational math software
Education companies of Australia
Companies based in Sydney